Garbno may refer to the following places:
Garbno, Gmina Barciany in Warmian-Masurian Voivodeship (north Poland)
Garbno, Gmina Korsze in Warmian-Masurian Voivodeship (north Poland)
Garbno, West Pomeranian Voivodeship (north-west Poland)